The Journey of Natty Gann is a 1985 American adventure film directed by Jeremy Paul Kagan, produced by Walt Disney Pictures and released by Buena Vista Distribution. The film introduced Meredith Salenger and also starred John Cusack, Lainie Kazan and Ray Wise.

Plot
In 1935, teenage tomboy Natty Gann lives in Chicago with her unemployed widowed father, Sol. After being out of work because of the Great Depression, Sol applies for work as a lumberjack in Washington. However, to take the job, he must leave on almost no notice on a company bus.  Unable to find Natty before departing, he leaves her a letter promising to send her the fare to join him as soon as he has earned it. Meanwhile, he makes arrangements with Connie, the shallow and insensitive innkeeper of their rooming-house, so Natty can stay on under Connie's temporary supervision.

After overhearing Connie reporting her as an abandoned child, Natty runs away to find her father on her own, embarking on a cross-country journey riding the rails along with other penniless travelers and hobos. Along the way she saves a wolfdog from a dog fighting ring. In return the dog, whom she calls Wolf, becomes her friend and protector in her attempt to return to her father. She has a brief, innocent romance with another young traveler, Harry, and encounters various obstacles that test her courage, perseverance, and ingenuity, such as being arrested after cattle rustling and remanded to a juvenile facility. Natty manages to escape the detention center and confronts the blacksmith who has been given control of the captured Wolf. The blacksmith turns out to be kind and fair-minded; he releases Wolf to Natty, and gives her food, a ride to a train station and enough money for a ticket. She is cheated of her ticket money by an unscrupulous ticket agent, and narrowly escapes his attempt to turn her in, returning to "riding the rails" illicitly on freight trains, where she is unexpectedly reunited with Harry in a rail-side shantytown.

When Natty's father calls Connie, she tells him Natty is gone. In a later phone call, he is grieved to learn that Natty's wallet was found underneath a derailed freight train — unbeknownst to him, she survived the crash. He is given a week's leave from the lumber company to search through the wreckage for her, but to no avail. He returns to the lumber camp and requests the most dangerous jobs, known as "widow's work", now that he seems to have little to live for.

Arriving on the west coast, Natty's journey takes several more challenging turns. Harry finds work through the federal Works Progress Administration in San Francisco, but she declines his invitation to go with him, preferring to find her father. The logging operation does not list Sol Gann among their workers, but Natty is undeterred, searching fruitlessly for him by showing other loggers his photo in a pendant he has given her which is her last trace of her parents. Wolf hears the calls of other wolves nearby, and Natty tearfully tells him to go join his own kind. The company clerk catches her in one of the backwoods camps and makes arrangements for her to be sent back down the mountain for her own safety. The clerk then unexpectedly finds the returned letter her father had sent enclosing her train ticket to rejoin him and tells Natty of his location. Natty sets out on foot and sees a company truck pass by loaded with injured men. In the truck, she glimpses her father. She runs after it, calling out for him, but is eventually devastated when it outpaces her. She hears his voice call out for her and finds him standing in the road.  They share an emotional embrace, with Wolf looking on from a nearby cliff.

Cast

Home media
The film has been released in the United States on VHS in April 1986, then again in 2002. The DVD version was released using the pan and scan format. The title was also made available for streaming and download in SD and HD versions (without pan and scan). It was released on Blu-Ray as part of Disney's Movie Club on July 17, 2018.

Reception
The movie received positive reviews. Review aggregator Rotten Tomatoes gave the film a rating of 91%, based on 32 reviews, with a rating average of 7.13/10. Critics praised the actors' performances and the film's portrayal of Depression-era life, while occasionally lamenting its pace and level of sentimentality.

Accolades
At the Young Artist Awards, Salenger won for Best Leading Young Actress in a Feature Film, and the film itself was nominated for Best Family Motion Picture (Drama). Albert Wolsky received an Academy Award nomination for Best Costume Design.

Music
Elmer Bernstein originally scored the picture, having to rewrite much of his material in the process; ultimately most of his music was replaced with a new score by James Horner.  Both scores were released on compact disc – Bernstein's in 2008 as part of a four-disc set of rejected scores by Varèse Sarabande (also including Gangs of New York and The Scarlet Letter) and Horner's in 2009 by Intrada Records.

References

External links
 
 
 
 
 

1985 films
1980s adventure films
1980s coming-of-age films
1980s teen drama films
American adventure drama films
American coming-of-age films
Films about families
Films directed by Jeremy Kagan
Films scored by James Horner
Films set in 1935
Films set in Alberta
Films set in British Columbia
Films set in Canada
Films set in Chicago
Films set in Illinois
Films set in jungles
Films set in Washington (state)
Films set on trains
Films shot in Alberta
Films shot in British Columbia
Films shot in Canada
Films shot in Chicago
Films shot in Illinois
Films shot in Washington (state)
Great Depression films
Walt Disney Pictures films
Films about wolves
1985 drama films
Films about father–daughter relationships
1980s English-language films
1980s American films